The James Smith House is a historic colonial house in Needham, Massachusetts, United States. It is a -story wood-frame structure, five bays wide, with a side gable roof and clapboard siding. Its front facade is symmetrical, with a center entrance with a Greek Revival surround consisting of flanking sidelight windows and a flat entablature above. The house was built c. 1727–28 by James Smith, a recent immigrant from Ireland. The house is one of the oldest in Needham.

The house was listed on the National Register of Historic Places in 1986.

See also
 National Register of Historic Places listings in Norfolk County, Massachusetts

References

Houses completed in 1730
Houses in Norfolk County, Massachusetts
Houses on the National Register of Historic Places in Norfolk County, Massachusetts
Greek Revival architecture in Massachusetts